Juw Juwinga (alias Jongema) of Bolsward was a Frisian chieftain that earned great fame in the struggle against the (Dutch) ‘infidels’. When Albrecht of Bavaria, count of Holland, threatened Friesland in 1396, Juw was chosen as potestate of Friesland. He advised luring the enemy into the land. The Schieringers limited their defense to the coastline. The Dutch were defeated at Schoterzijl (in Weststellingwerf) where Juw was slain on August 29, 1396.

Juw was also known as Julius Jongema, and Petrus Thaborita wrote his name as Ju Jonghema.

The previous potestate was Hessel Martena.  However the potestates were absent for many years due to arguments between Vetkopers and Schieringers and Juw was the eleventh potestaat.

Sources and references
Brouwers, J.H., J.J. Klama, W. Kok, and M. Wiegersma, eds., Encyclopedie van Friesland, (Amsterdam: Elsevier, 1958) s.v. Juw Juwinga.

1396 deaths
Medieval West Frisians
Military personnel killed in action
People from Bolsward
Year of birth unknown
14th-century people of the Holy Roman Empire